Paolo Grecucci (born 2 February 1952) is an Italian former racewalking athlete. He was a five-time participant at the IAAF World Race Walking Cup and was a bronze medallist in the 50 kilometres race walk at the event in 1977.

Biography
Grecucci twice competed for Italy at the European Athletics Championships (1978 and 1982) with his best placing being 15th. Following the event being dropped form the Olympic programme the 1976 World Championships in Athletics was held for 50 km walk and Grecucci was Italy's best performer in seventh place.

At national level, he was twice the 50 km walk winner at the Italian Athletics Championships.

International competitions

National titles
Italian Athletics Championships
50 km walk: 1976, 1978

References

External links
 

Living people
1952 births
Italian male racewalkers
20th-century Italian people